Saga pedo is a species of bush cricket, spread throughout the European part of the Mediterranean, and Asia as far east as China. Colloquially known as the predatory bush cricket, or the spiked magician (due to the "enchanting" manner in which it waves its forelimbs as it approaches its prey), it is uncommon among its kind due to its carnivorous lifestyle, most often preying on smaller insects, with a known tendency towards cannibalism as well. For this purpose, it has strong fore and mid legs, equipped with sharp spines. When these animals are hunting, they move about, catching their prey by suddenly leaping on them and grabbing them with their legs. Their prey is usually killed by biting into the throat, and eating is done at capture. Saga pedo is active at dusk and during nighttime, with activity slowly expanding through the day at the end of the season.

Life cycle 
The female attains sexual maturity three to four weeks after hatching and starts laying eggs. A single egg is deposited by stabbing the long, sharp ovipositor into the soil at a suitable site. The female will lay from twenty five to eighty eggs. Development depends largely on the ambient temperature. At  or more, the eggs start to develop immediately, the nymphs hatching after approximately 40 to 85 days (again depending on the temperature). At colder conditions, the eggs enter diapause, which is a delay in development and can result in the eggs remaining buried for up to five years (mostly two to three). After hatching, which occurs around May, the nymphs go through six or seven instars before attaining sexual maturity, and live for four to six months after that.

Saga pedo is also uncommon in that it mostly reproduces asexually, with parthenogenesis. The population therefore appears to consist solely of females and there is no reliable record of a male of this species. They also have the largest number of chromosomes among members of the genus Saga - 68 - and are probably tetraploid.

Ecology and distribution 
Adults are eaten by birds, insectivores, rodents, lizards, frogs, and toads. Nymphs are eaten by spiders, scorpions, centipedes, and preying insects.

Saga species inhabit both dry and wet meadows, pastures, shrub by hillsides, gorges, and as well follow grain fields and vineyards in southern Europe and western Asia from the Iberian peninsula across central Europe and central Asia to China. Like other Saga species, S. pedo is comfortable with adverse weather conditions, and can be found in habitats from sea level to altitudes up to about 1500 m, and occasionally higher. The southernmost known locality is Sicily, while the northernmost is in Kurgan Oblast, Russia, at latitude 54º30' N. Its range is vast, but the population is spread thinly, threatened by insecticide use and habitat destruction. Therefore, the species is considered vulnerable at a global scale.

Saga pedo was reported as an accidental introduction from Europe into Tompkins Township, Jackson County, Michigan (USA) in 1970. In all, only six specimens were found from 1970 to 1972, during August and September. None have been found since by a reliable authority, so they are considered extirpated from North America. There have been occasional unconfirmed sightings in subsequent decades, and catching of several specimens in Michigan from 2004 on were reported by a local high school teacher in the New York Biology Teachers Association's publication, however, this remains to be confirmed by a scholarly source.

References 

Lemonnier-Darcemont M., Darcemont C., Heller K.-G., Dutrillaux A.-M. & Dutrillaux B., (2016) : Saginae of Europe. Edition G.E.E.M., Cannes, France. 208 pp. 

Tettigoniidae
Insects of Asia
Orthoptera of Europe
Insects of the Middle East
Insects of Afghanistan
Insects of China
Insects of Iran
Insects of Pakistan
Insects of Turkey
Insects of Central Asia
Fauna of East Asia
Fauna of Western Asia
Insects described in 1771
Taxonomy articles created by Polbot
Taxa named by Peter Simon Pallas